Doorain is a Pakistani film directed by Hassan Askari, based on a story by Bashir Niaz, and produced by S. A. Gul under banner Evernew Pictures. It stars Shabnam, Mohammed Ali and Faisal Rehman with Agha Talish in the supporting cast along with others. The music was composed by Robin Ghosh. It was released on 6 April 1984. A golden jubilee hit film of the year, it received 7 Nigar Awards including "best film". Doorian was also remade in Bollywood as Aandhiyan (1990).

Plot 

Due to the relation of a married couple where the influential and rich husband mistreats his wife, the latter gets separated from him. The plot then revolves around the struggle of the wife to attain the custody of her son, and to lead her life as a single parent.

Cast 

 Shabnam
 Mohammed Ali
 Faisal Rehman
 Agha Talish
 Arzoo
 Hanif
 Ibrahim Nafees

Guest cast 
 Ghulam Mohiuddin
 Aslam Pervaiz
 Afzaal Ahmad
 Nanha
 Rangeela
 Firdous Jamal

Soundtrack 

All songs were written by lyricist Saeed Gillani and the msuic was composed by Robin Ghosh.

Track list

Remake 

The film was remade in Hindi in 1990 with the title Aandhiyan, starring Shatrughan Sinha, Mumtaz, Prosenjit Chatterjee.

Awards 

At the annual Nigar Awards ceremony, Doorian won seven trophies in the following categories:

References 

Urdu-language Pakistani films
1980s Urdu-language films
Urdu films remade in other languages
Pakistani drama films